Colin Davey (4 May 1932 – 9 March 2006) was  a former Australian rules footballer who played with Fitzroy in the Victorian Football League (VFL).

Notes

External links 
		

1932 births
2006 deaths
Australian rules footballers from Victoria (Australia)
Fitzroy Football Club players